is a town located in Yamagata Prefecture, Japan. ,  the town had an estimated population of 19,303,in 6267 households  and a population density of 350 persons per km².

Geography
Kahoku is located in central Yamagata Prefecture, in a river valley of the Mogami River, with branches of the Ōu Mountains to the east and west.

Neighboring municipalities
Yamagata Prefecture
Sagae
Higashine
Murayama
Tendō

Climate
Kahoku has a Humid continental climate (Köppen climate classification Cfa) with large seasonal temperature differences, with warm to hot (and often humid) summers and cold (sometimes severely cold) winters. Precipitation is significant throughout the year, but is heaviest from August to October. The average annual temperature in Kahoku is 11.6 °C. The average annual rainfall is 1461 mm with September as the wettest month. The temperatures are highest on average in August, at around 25.3 °C, and lowest in January, at around -1.1 °C.

Demographics
Per Japanese census data, the population of Kahoku has declined over the past 60 years.

History
The area of present-day Kahoku was part of ancient Dewa Province. After the start of the Meiji period, the area became part of Nishimurayama District, Yamagata Prefecture. The village of Yachi was established with the creation of the modern municipalities system on April 1, 1889 and was raised to town status on April 2, 1896. The town of Kahoku was established on April 1, 1954.

Economy
The economy of Kahoku is based on agriculture, notably the growing of cherries. The area was traditionally noted for raising safflowers. Manufacturing of slippers is also an important local industry.

Education
Kahoku has six public elementary schools and one public middle school operated by the town government and one public high schools operated by the Yamagata Prefectural Board of Education.

Transportation

Railway
Kahoku does not have any passenger railway service.

Highway

Twin towns – sister cities

 Cañon City, Colorado, United States, since October 20, 1993

References

External links
 
Official Website 

 
Towns in Yamagata Prefecture